Vela 2A, also known as Vela 3, Vela Hotel 3 and OPS 3662, was a U.S. military satellite developed to detect nuclear detonations to monitor compliance with the 1963 Partial Test Ban Treaty by the Soviet Union. The secondary task of the ship was space research (X-rays, gamma rays, neutrons, magnetic field and charged particles).

Launch
Vela 2A was released on July 17, 1964 from the Cape Canaveral Air Force Station, Florida, through an Atlas-Agena launch vehicle. Vela 2A was launched along with Vela 2B and with ERS 13.

Capabilities
Vela 2A was rotationally stabilized (2 rotations per sec.). The ship could work in real time mode (one data frame per second) or in data recording mode (one frame every 256 seconds). The first mode was used for the first 40% of the mission's duration. The second one was used until the next pair of Vela satellites were launched.

Instruments
 X-ray and charged particle detector
 Gamma ray detector and charged particles
 Neutron detector
 Electron and proton spectrometer
 Background radiation detector
 Solid state detector
 Geiger-Muller counters
 Magnetometer

See also 
 Vela 1A

References

External links 
 Vela 2. Heavens Above

1964 in spaceflight
Military space program of the United States
Derelict satellites orbiting Earth